William "Bill" A. Gardner (September 6, 1868 – Unknown) was an American professional baseball player who played three games for the Baltimore Orioles of the American Association in .
He was born in Baltimore, Maryland.

External links

Major League Baseball pitchers
Baseball players from Maryland
Baltimore Orioles (AA) players
1868 births
1948 deaths
Petersburg (minor league baseball) players
19th-century baseball players